The Nikon 105mm 2.8G IF-ED AF-S VR is a macro prime lens produced by Nikon Corporation. It is compatible with FX sized sensors as well as DX format.

Introduction 

Nikon announced the lens on 21 February 2006, also making it the first macro lens to feature vibration reduction.

Features 

 105mm focal length (approximately equivalent to a 157.5mm lens when used on a DX format camera)
 1:1 image reproduction ratio
 Vibration Reduction II technology
 Compact silent wave autofocus motor with full-time manual override
 Nikon F-lens mount
 Nine-blade rounded diaphragm
 Extra-low Dispersion (ED) glass element to reduce chromatic aberration
 Nano crystal coated glass element to reduce internal lens reflections and lens flare
 Super integrated coating (SIC) to reduce flare and ghosts.
 Internal focusing (IF)

See also
List of Nikon compatible lenses with integrated autofocus-motor

References 

Camera lenses introduced in 2006
Nikon F-mount lenses